The Clark House in Prescott, Arizona, at 109 N. Pleasant, was built in 1883, and it was moved a short distance in about 1899.  It was listed on the National Register of Historic Places in 1978.

It is also known as the Eli P. Clark House, named for Eli P. Clark, a co-owner of the Pioneer sawmill which contractually provided the Atlantic and Pacific Railroad with railroad ties during the railroad's construction. At the time of its move, some modifications may have been made, but "the building has retained those features which distinguish it from later styles."

The house has been renovated after it was purchased in 2016 and is operated as a vacation rental, the Pleasant Street Guest House.

References

External links
 

National Register of Historic Places in Yavapai County, Arizona
Houses completed in 1883
Buildings and structures in Prescott, Arizona